The following is a list 2016 NPF transactions that have occurred in the National Pro Fastpitch softball league since the completion of the 2015 season and during the 2016 season. It lists which team each player has been traded to, signed by, or claimed by, and for which player(s) or draft pick (s), if applicable. Players who have retired are also listed.  Per Commissioner Cheri Kempf's tweet, NPF contracts expire in February, therefore the extension of a contract "through 2018" means the player is only contracted to play through the 2017 season, with the contract expiring the following February.  "Thru 2018 season" therefore would mean a contract that expires in February 2019, covering only games played in 2018.

For selections in drafts impacting the 2016 season (the Scrap Yard Dawgs expansion draft and the college draft), see 2016 NPF Draft.

As of August 1, 5:00 pm EST, all team rosters were made fixed and constant through the conclusion of the 2016 NPF Championship Series.

Transactions 
Source:Any transactions listed below without a reference were originally announced on

References

External links 
 

Softball in the United States